The Future Immersive Training Environment (FITE) Joint Capability Technology Demonstration (JCTD) was a three-year $36-million Department of Defense initiative to demonstrate the value of advanced small unit immersive infantry training systems. It demonstrated infantry applications of virtual reality, mixed reality, and augmented reality.

References

United States Department of Defense